George Alpin Chisholm (December 2, 1887 – January 20, 1920) was an American track and field athlete who competed in the 1912 Summer Olympics. He was born in Attleboro, Massachusetts. In 1912 he was eliminated in the semi-finals of the 110 metre hurdles competition.

References

External links

1887 births
1920 deaths
American male hurdlers
Olympic track and field athletes of the United States
Athletes (track and field) at the 1912 Summer Olympics